Hermann Blazejczak (3 June 1912 – 13 January 2008) was a German athlete who competed in the 1936 Summer Olympics. He was born in Hildesheim and died in Mönchengladbach.

References

1912 births
2008 deaths
German male sprinters
Olympic athletes of Germany
Athletes (track and field) at the 1936 Summer Olympics
European Athletics Championships medalists
Sportspeople from Hildesheim